Simone Deromedis (born 2 April 2000) is an Italian Ski cross racer.  He represented Italy at the 2022 Winter Olympics in the event in which he placed 5th.
At the 2023 World Championships held in Bakuriani, Georgia, won the golden medal in the Ski cross.

References

External links
 

Living people
2000 births
Italian male freestyle skiers
Olympic freestyle skiers of Italy
Freestyle skiers at the 2022 Winter Olympics
Sportspeople from Trento
21st-century Italian people